Handball Club Astrakhanochka is a Russian women's handball club from Astrakhan established in 1993. It has played in the Russian Super League since 1999, and in 2004 it made its debut in EHF competitions. It reached the EHF Cup's semifinals in 2014 and the Cup Winners' Cup's quarterfinals in 2007.

In reaction to the 2022 Russian invasion of Ukraine, the International Handball Federation banned Russian athletes, and the European Handball Federation suspended the  Russian clubs from competing in European handball competitions.

Kits

European record

Team

Current squad 
Squad for the 2021–22 season

Goalkeepers
 1  Anastasiia Riabtseva
 12  Anna Prokopeva
 16  Evelina Anoshkina
 31  Tamara Gobadze
Wingers
LW
 5  Ekaterina Fanina
 28  Galina Nikiforova
 55  Viktoria Shichkina
 91  Kristina Tarasova
RW
 9  Oksana Bessalaia
 71  Anna Kainarova
 64  Mariia Dudina
Line players
 3  Varvara Iureva
 14  Ksenia Zakordonskaya
 19  Svetlana Kremneva
 67  Anastasia Illarionova

Back players
LB
 27  Galina Izmailova
 33  Sofia Romanenko
 77  Viktoriya Divak
CB
 10  Kseniia Iliina
 24  Violetta Goletc
 25  Anastasiia Listopad
 34  Elizaveta Malashenko
RB
 7  Karina Sisenova
 13  Anna Shaposhnikova
 87  Irina Korneeva

Transfers
Transfers for the 2022-23 season

Joining
  Irina Alexandrova (LB) (from  USC Dostyk)

Leaving
  Karina Sisenova (RB) (to  HC Lada)

References

Russian handball clubs
Sport in Astrakhan